Ill Met by Moonlight (1957), released in the USA as Night Ambush (which is eleven minutes shorter than the British release), is a film by the British writer-director-producer team of Michael Powell and Emeric Pressburger, and the last movie they made together through their production company "The Archers". The film, which stars Dirk Bogarde and features Marius Goring, David Oxley, and Cyril Cusack, is based on the 1950 book Ill Met by Moonlight: The Abduction of General Kreipe by W. Stanley Moss, which is an account of events during the author's service on Crete during World War II as an agent of the Special Operations Executive (SOE). The title is a quotation from Shakespeare's A Midsummer Night's Dream, and the book features the young agents' capture and evacuation of the German general Heinrich Kreipe.

Plot
During World War II, the Greek island of Crete is occupied by the Nazis. British officers Major Patrick Leigh Fermor DSO (Dirk Bogarde) and Captain Bill Stanley Moss MC (David Oxley) of the Special Operations Executive (SOE) land on the island and meet with other British agents and members of the Cretan resistance.   In April 1944, they kidnap General Kreipe (Marius Goring), the German commander of the island's occupying forces and, in disguise, drive his car through a number of German checkpoints until they abandon it and set off on foot with the General.

Travelling mainly by night across mountainous territory, the group has to evade surveillance by German search parties looking for the General, but is given assistance by townspeople and other resistance partisans.  Along the way, Kreipe seems to be resigned to having to cooperate, but he leaves personal tokens at several stops as clues for searchers to follow.  He also feigns an injury to his shoulder to slow down the group's progress.  After a final push to reach a secluded cove on the far side of the island where they are to be picked up by the Royal Navy, the group finds the area occupied by German troops.

A young boy travelling with the group is asked by the British officers to deliver a message to local partisans, but Kreipe tries to bribe the boy into going to the German camp, telling him that if the boy delivers a coin known to belong to the General, the Germans will give him a pair of boots.  The boy seems to fall for the ruse when the group watches the shore from above and sees him going to the German camp.  Instead of heading up the hills to engage with the British and retrieve the General, however, the Germans march into a valley where a partisan ambush is waiting for them.

The British and Cretans, along with Kreipe, who has stopped pretending that he was injured, arrive at the beach and finally are picked up by the British ship that is to transport them to Cairo, the Middle East headquarters of British forces. On board the vessel, Fermor and Moss return the items that the General had planted during their trek, comparing them to the "breadcrumbs" left by Hansel in the story of Hansel and Gretel and comparing the Cretan Resistance, once disdained by the General, as the "birds" who take the breadcrumbs in the story.

Cast
Dirk Bogarde as Major Patrick "Paddy" Leigh Fermor aka "Philedem"
Marius Goring as Major General Heinrich Kreipe
David Oxley as Captain W. Stanley "Billy" Moss, M.C.
Dimitri Andreas as Niko Soldan Emeris
Cyril Cusack as Captain Sandy Rendel
Laurence Payne as Manoli
Wolfe Morris as George
Michael Gough as Andoni Zoidakis
John Cairney as Elias
Rowland Bartrop as Micky Akoumianakis
Brian Worth as Stratis Saviolkis
Paul Stassino as Yanni Katsias
Adeeb Assaly as Zahari

Cast notes:
Marius Goring had appeared in three other Powell and Pressburger films: The Spy in Black (1939), A Matter of Life and Death (1946) and The Red Shoes (1948). Goring replaced Curt Jürgens, who was the original choice to play the part of General Kreipe.
Christopher Lee and David McCallum have small parts: Lee as a German officer in the dentist scene, and McCallum, in his film debut, as a sailor on the ship that picks up the group. Lee's part was edited out of the 1959 American re-release of the film. A "John Houseman" in the cast does not appear to be the well-known actor and director John Houseman.

Production
Emeric Pressburger had read and bought the rights to W. Stanley Moss's book in 1950, but production would not begin for another six years.  Following the success of The Battle of the River Plate (1956, American title: Pursuit of the Graf Spee), The Archers agreed to a one-film contract with the Rank Organisation, but disagreements between Powell and Pressburger over that contract and aspects of the film production contributed to the final breakup of The Archers as a production company.

In Million Dollar Movie (1992), the second volume of Michael Powell's memoirs, he describes Ill Met by Moonlight as one of The Archers' "greatest failures," despite the film's financial success.  Part of his unhappiness is attributed to Pressburger's screenplay, but he also describes conflicts with Rank's studio bosses over casting, film format, and locations.  Dirk Bogarde was eventually cast as Fermor, despite Powell's misgivings, and the filming was done in VistaVision but in black-and-white. Cyprus was experiencing armed insurgency at the time, so filming took place at Pinewood Studios in England, with location shooting in the Alpes-Maritimes in France and Italy, and on the Côte d'Azur in France. Both Patrick Leigh Fermor and Xan Fielding were present on the location shots in Alpes-Maritime as advisors. The movie's score by Greek composer Mikis Theodorakis, who had been raised on the island of Crete, was his first for motion pictures.  Watching the movie again years later, Powell complained that he "was surprised by how bad the film was," happy or at least content with the setting and music but especially disappointed in the performances of the lead actors and his own direction, which "concentrated so much on creating a Greek atmosphere that [Powell] had no time,  or invention for anything else."

Although Powell was especially unhappy with Bogarde's performance, Patrick Leigh Fermor expressed great satisfaction with Bogarde's representation of him.

Box office
The film was the seventh most popular movie at the British box office in 1957.

According to Kinematograph Weekly the film was "in the money" at the British box office in 1957.

In popular culture
The story was affectionately parodied by Spike Milligan in the 1957 Goon Show episode, "Ill Met by Goonlight".

See also
Sophie Moss
Patrick Leigh Fermor

References
Notes

Bibliography
 Christie, Ian. Arrows of Desire: the films of Michael Powell and Emeric Pressburger. London: Faber & Faber, 1994. . 163pp (illus. filmog. bibliog. index).
 Fermor, Patrick Leigh. Words of Mercury. John Murray, 2004. .
 Moss, W. Stanley. Ill Met by Moonlight. London: Harrap, 1950. .
 Moss, W. Stanley. A War of Shadows. London: T.V. Boardman, 1952. OCLC: 2057976. 240pp (illus. 21 cm). 
 Powell, Michael. A Life in Movies: An Autobiography. London: Heinemann, 1986. .
 Powell, Michael. Million Dollar Movie. London: Heinemann, 1992. .

External links
 
 
 
 
 
 Reviews and articles at the Powell & Pressburger Review Pages
 . Full synopsis and film stills (and clips viewable from UK libraries).

1957 films
1957 war films
British black-and-white films
Films based on non-fiction books
Films by Powell and Pressburger
Films shot at Pinewood Studios
World War II films based on actual events
Films set in Crete
Films shot in France
Films shot in Italy
Films scored by Mikis Theodorakis
Films set in Axis-occupied Greece
1950s English-language films